Turn It On is the second studio album by Indonesian blues rock band Gugun and the Bluesbug, which later changed to Gugun Blues Shelter and was also known as Gugun Power Trio.

Track listing
All song written and composed by Gugun and the Bluesbug.

Personnel
 Gugun - lead guitar and lead vocals
 Jono Armstrong - bass guitar
 Agung - drums
 Bowie - session drums

References

External links 
 Official site

2007 albums
Gugun Blues Shelter albums